The Karnataka State Film Awards 1984–85, presented by Government of Karnataka, to felicitate the best of Kannada Cinema released in the year 1984.

Film Awards

Other Awards

References

Karnataka State Film Awards